Bodrai Thanda is a Hamlet village in Perumandla sankeesa, Dornakal Mandal, Mahabubabad district in the Indian state of Telangana.

References 

https://plus.google.com/116089219523372537790

Villages in Mahabubabad district